Androlyperus is a genus of skeletonizing leaf beetles in the family Chrysomelidae. There are about five described species in Androlyperus. They are found in North America and Mexico.

Species
These five species belong to the genus Androlyperus:
 Androlyperus californicus (Schaeffer, 1906)
 Androlyperus fulvus Crotch, 1873
 Androlyperus incisus Schaeffer, 1906
 Androlyperus maculatus J. L. LeConte, 1883
 Androlyperus nigrescens (Schaeffer, 1906)

References

Further reading

 
 
 
 

Galerucinae
Chrysomelidae genera
Articles created by Qbugbot
Taxa named by George Robert Crotch